Walter Charles Dance  (born 10 October 1946) is an English actor. He is known for playing strict, authoritarian characters and villains. Dance started his career on stage with the Royal Shakespeare Company (RSC) before appearing in film and television. For his services to drama he was appointed an Officer of the Order of the British Empire (OBE) by Queen Elizabeth II in 2006.

His made his feature film debut in the James Bond film For Your Eyes Only (1981). He since acted in a string of critically acclaimed period films such as Michael Collins (1996), Gosford Park (2001), The Imitation Game (2014), Mank (2020), and The King's Man (2021). He's also appeared in the films The Golden Child (1986), Alien 3 (1992), Last Action Hero (1993),  Dracula Untold (2014), and Godzilla: King of the Monsters (2019). He made his directorial film debut with the drama film Ladies in Lavender (2004), which he also wrote and executive produced.

On television, Dance played Guy Perron in The Jewel in the Crown (1984), Mr Tulkinghorn in Bleak House (2005), Tywin Lannister in Game of Thrones (2011–2015), and Lord Mountbatten in the third and fourth seasons of The Crown (2019–2020). For his role in The Crown, he was nominated for a Primetime Emmy Award for Outstanding Guest Actor in a Drama Series.

Early life 
Walter Charles Dance was born in Redditch, Worcestershire on 10 October 1946, the younger son of Eleanor Marion ( Perks; 1911–1984), a cook, and Walter Dance (1874–1949), an electrical engineer who served as a sergeant in the 2nd Regular Battalion of the Royal Fusiliers during the Second Boer War (having previously served in the 2nd Volunteer Battalion) and who was in his 70s when his younger son was born. By his father's previous marriage, Dance had two older half-sisters, Norah (1898–1993) and Mary (1903–1908). He also has an elder brother, Michael (born 1936).

During filming of an episode for the genealogical series Who Do You Think You Are? in 2016, Dance also discovered that his mother had Belgian ancestry, which traced back to the city of Spa. His immigrant ancestor Charles François Futvoye (1777–1847) had been a pioneer in the art of Japanning during the early half of the 19th century. Growing up in Plymouth, Dance attended the now-defunct Widey Technical School for Boys (then known as Widey High School) in Crownhill. He later attended Arts University Plymouth and De Montfort University (then known as the Leicester College of Arts), where he studied graphic design and photography.

Career

Royal Shakespeare Company (RSC)
Dance was a member of the Royal Shakespeare Company during the mid-to-late 1970s and was in many of their productions in London and Stratford-upon-Avon. Later he returned to the RSC to take the title role in Coriolanus at Stratford-upon-Avon and Newcastle in 1989, and at the Barbican Theatre in 1990. He received rave reviews and a Critics' Circle Best Actor award for his performance as C. S. Lewis in William Nicholson's Shadowlands, in the 2007 stage revival.

Television and film 
Dance made his screen debut in 1974, in the ITV series Father Brown as Commandant Neil O'Brien in "The Secret Garden". Other small parts followed, including a 1983 cameo as a South African assassin in The Professionals, but his big break came the following year when he played Guy Perron in The Jewel in the Crown (Granada Television, Christopher Morahan 1984), an adaptation of Paul Scott's novels that also made stars of Geraldine James and Art Malik. Dance made one of his earliest big-screen appearances in the 1981 James Bond film For Your Eyes Only as evil henchman Claus.  Though he turned down the opportunity to screen test for the James Bond role, in 1989 he played Bond creator Ian Fleming in Anglia Television's dramatised biography directed by Don Boyd, Goldeneye (the name of Fleming's estate in Jamaica and a title later used for a James Bond film).

He has also starred in many other British television dramas such as Edward the Seventh (as Prince Albert Victor, Duke of Clarence and Avondale, Edward VII's oldest son, and heir to the throne), Murder Rooms, Randall and Hopkirk, Rebecca, The Phantom of the Opera, Fingersmith and Bleak House (for which he received an Emmy nomination for Outstanding Lead Actor in a Miniseries or a Movie). He was name-checked in the British comedy series Absolutely Fabulous, as being slated to play the title character in The Life of Jesus Christ 2, which was filming in Morocco at the same time as the main characters of the series were there for a photo shoot. He also played Guy Spencer, the pro-Hitler propagandist, in the second instalment of Foyle's War, and had an ongoing role as Dr. Maltravers in the ITV drama Trinity.

Dance made a guest appearance on the BBC drama series Merlin as the Witchfinder Aredian, and as a vainglorious version of himself in the third series of Jam & Jerusalem. He played Lord Vetinari in the 2010 Sky adaptation of Terry Pratchett's Going Postal, and as the Russian oligarch Aleksandr Borinski in Paris Connections. He played the role of Tywin Lannister in HBO's Game of Thrones, based on the A Song of Ice and Fire novels by George R. R. Martin. Dance was wooed for the role by the producers while filming Your Highness in Belfast. Dance also played Conrad Knox on the British television series Strike Back: Vengeance as the primary villain in the series.

On 30 June 2013, Dance appeared with other celebrities in an episode of the BBC's Top Gear as a "Star in a Reasonably Priced Car" for the debut of the Vauxhall Astra. In summer 2018, Dance narrated a documentary entitled Spitfire, which featured the legendary Supermarine Spitfire and recounted the efforts of the RAF pilots who flew them during the Second World War.

In 2019, he played an antagonist in Godzilla: King of the Monsters and appeared as Lord Mountbatten in series 3 of The Crown later in the same year.

In 2020, Dance portrayed William Randolph Hearst in David Fincher's Mank, co-starring alongside Gary Oldman and Amanda Seyfried.

In January 2021, Dance was cast in the Netflix adaptation of The Sandman.

Screenwriting and directing 
Dance's debut film as a screenwriter and director was Ladies in Lavender (2004), which starred Judi Dench and Maggie Smith. In 2009, he directed his own adaptation of Alice Thomas Ellis's The Inn at the Edge of the World.

Personal life 
Dance lives in North London. He married Joanna Haythorn in 1970, and they had a son named Oliver (born 1974) and a daughter named Rebecca (born 1980) before divorcing in 2004. He later dated Eleanor Boorman from 2008 to 2012, and they had a daughter named Rose (born 2012).

Honours
Dance was appointed an Officer of the Order of the British Empire (OBE) on 17 June 2006.

Filmography

Film

Television

Video games

Audiobooks

Podcasts

Stage 

 Toad of Toad Hall as Badger (1971)
 The Beggar's Opera as Wat Dreary (Chichester Festival Theatre, 1972)
 The Taming of the Shrew as Philip (Chichester, 1972)
 Three Sisters as Soliony (Greenwich Theatre, 1973)
 Hans Kohlhaus as Meissen (Greenwich, 1973)
 Born Yesterday as Hotel Manager (Greenwich, 1973)
 Saint Joan as Baudricourt (Oxford Festival, 1974)
 The Sleeping Beauty as Prince (1974)
 Travesties as Henry Carr (Leeds Playhouse, 1977)
 Hamlet as Fortinbras / Reynaldo / Player (RSC The Other Place 1975; The Roundhouse, 1976)
 Perkin Warbeck as Hialas / Astley / Spanish Ambassador (RSC The Other Place, 1975)
 Richard III as Catesby / Murderer (RSC The Other Place, 1975)
 Henry V as Henry V (RSC Glasgow and New York, 1975)
 Henry IV, Part One and Henry IV, Part Two as Prince John of Lancaster (RSC Stratford, 1975; Aldwych Theatre, 1976)
 As You Like It as Oliver (RSC Stratford, 1977; Aldwych, 1978)
 Henry V as Scroop / Williams (RSC Stratford, 1977)
 Henry VI, Part 2 as Buckingham (RSC Stratford, 1977; Aldwych, 1978)
 The Jail Diary of Albie Sachs as Whistling Guard / Freeman (RSC Donmar Warehouse, 1978; The Other Place, 1979)
 Coriolanus as Volscian Lieutenant (RSC Stratford, 1977)
 Coriolanus as Tullus Aufidius (Aldwych, 1978 and 1979)
 The Women Pirates as Blackie / Vosquin (RSC Aldwych, 1978)
 The Changeling as Tomazo (RSC Aldwych, 1978)
 Irma la Douce as Nestor (Shaftesbury Theatre, 1979)
 The Heiress as Morris Townsend (1980)
 Turning Over as Frank (Bush Theatre, 1983)
 Coriolanus as Coriolanus (RSC Stratford and Newcastle upon Tyne, 1989; Barbican Theatre, 1990)
 Three Sisters as Vershinin (Birmingham Rep, 1998)
 Good as John Halder (Donmar Warehouse, 1999)
 Long Day's Journey into Night as James Tyrone (Lyric Theatre, 2000)
 The Play What I Wrote as a guest star (Wyndham's Theatre, 20012002)
 Celebration as Richard (Gate Theatre, Dublin; Albery Theatre, 2005)
 The Exonerated (Riverside Studios, Hammersmith, London, 2006)
 Eh Joe as Joe (Parade Theatre, Sydney, 2006)
 Shadowlands as C. S. Lewis (Wyndham's Theatre, 2007 and Novello Theatre 20072008)

Awards and nominations

Further reading 
 Who's Who in the Theatre, 16th/17th editions, edited by Ian Herbert, Pitman/Gale 1977/1981
 Theatre Record and Theatre Record Indexes
 Halliwell's Who's Who in the Movies Fourth edition by John Walker, HarperCollins 2006 
 Charles Dance's own CVs in various theatre programmes

References

External links 
 
 

1946 births
Living people
20th-century English male actors
21st-century English male actors
Alumni of De Montfort University
Alumni of the Plymouth College of Art
Audiobook narrators
Critics' Circle Theatre Award winners
English male film actors
English male Shakespearean actors
English male stage actors
English male television actors
English people of Belgian descent
Male actors from Plymouth, Devon
Officers of the Order of the British Empire
Outstanding Performance by a Cast in a Motion Picture Screen Actors Guild Award winners
People from Redditch
Royal Shakespeare Company members